Wheatland Township may refer to:

Illinois
 Wheatland Township, Bureau County, Illinois
 Wheatland Township, Fayette County, Illinois
 Wheatland Township, Will County, Illinois

Iowa
 Wheatland Township, Carroll County, Iowa

Kansas
 Wheatland Township, Barton County, Kansas
 Wheatland Township, Dickinson County, Kansas
 Wheatland Township, Ellis County, Kansas
 Wheatland Township, Ford County, Kansas

Michigan
 Wheatland Township, Hillsdale County, Michigan
 Wheatland Township, Mecosta County, Michigan
 Wheatland Township, Sanilac County, Michigan

Minnesota
 Wheatland Township, Rice County, Minnesota

Missouri
 Wheatland Township, Hickory County, Missouri

North Dakota
 Wheatland Township, Cass County, North Dakota, in Cass County, North Dakota

South Dakota
 Wheatland Township, Day County, South Dakota, in Day County, South Dakota

See also
Wheatland (disambiguation)

Township name disambiguation pages